The Chris Walden Big Band is a Grammy-nominated 18-piece jazz big band based in Los Angeles, California, founded in 1999 by German composer and arranger Chris Walden. The band consists of Los Angeles-based studio musicians who suggested to Walden he should form his own band, after having played his music for various projects in studios.

The band exclusively plays Walden's own material, which consists of his own compositions or his contemporary arrangements of jazz tunes or film themes. Vocalists who have appeared frequently with the Chris Walden Big Band are Tierney Sutton, Carol Welsman, and Courtney Fortune. The band frequently plays in and around Los Angeles.

Discography

 Chris Walden Big Band - Home Of My Heart (2005)
 Chris Walden Big Band - No Bounds (2006)
 Chris Walden Big Band & St. John's Choir - Kurt Marti Suite (2007)
 Chris Walden Big Band - "Full-On!" (2014)

Awards and nominations

2005 Grammy Award nominations:
Best Large Jazz Ensemble Album - Home Of My Heart
Best Instrumental Arrangement - Cherokee from Home Of My Heart

References

Sources
 Jack Behrens, Big Bands & Great Ballrooms

External links
 Official Website
 AllAboutJazz.com - Chris Walden
 Origin Records - Chris Walden Big Band

American jazz ensembles from California
Musical groups from Los Angeles
Big bands
Jazz musicians from California